Orthocomotis is a genus of moths belonging to the family Tortricidae.

Taxonomy
Orthocomotis was initially classified as a member of the tribe Euliini. It was shifted to the tribe Polyorthini based on genital morphology; however, more recent research has shown that Orthocomotis should be moved back into the tribe Euliini.

Species
Orthocomotis aglaia  Clarke, 1956
Orthocomotis albimarmorea  Razowski & Wojtusiak, 2006
Orthocomotis albobasalis Razowski, Pelz & Wojtusiak, 2007
Orthocomotis alshiana Razowski, Pelz & Wojtusiak, 2007
Orthocomotis altivolans  Brown, 2003
Orthocomotis andina Razowski, Pelz & Wojtusiak, 2007
Orthocomotis aphanisma  Razowski & Becker, 1990
Orthocomotis argodonta  Clarke, 1956
Orthocomotis attonsa Razowski, 1982
Orthocomotis auchmera Razowski, 1982
Orthocomotis benedeki Razowski & Wojtusiak, 2013
Orthocomotis boscantica  (Dognin, 1912) 
Orthocomotis carolina Razowski, Pelz & Wojtusiak, 2007
Orthocomotis chaldera  (Druce, 1889) 
Orthocomotis chlamyda  Razowski & Wojtusiak, 2006
Orthocomotis chloantha  (Walsingham, 1914) 
Orthocomotis cosangana Razowski, Pelz & Wojtusiak, 2007
Orthocomotis euchaldera  Clarke, 1956
Orthocomotis exolivata  Clarke, 1956
Orthocomotis expansa  Razowski, 1999
Orthocomotis ferruginea Razowski, Pelz & Wojtusiak, 2007
Orthocomotis gielisi Razowski, Pelz & Wojtusiak, 2007
Orthocomotis golondrina Razowski, Pelz & Wojtusiak, 2007
Orthocomotis grandisocia  Razowski, 1999
Orthocomotis herbacea  Clarke, 1956
Orthocomotis herbaria  (Busck, 1920) 
Orthocomotis independentia  Razowski, 1999
Orthocomotis lactistrigata Razowski, Pelz & Wojtusiak, 2007
Orthocomotis leucothorax  Clarke, 1956
Orthocomotis longicilia  Brown, 2003
Orthocomotis longuncus  Razowski & Pelz, 2003
Orthocomotis magicana  (Zeller, 1866) 
Orthocomotis mareda  Clarke, 1956
Orthocomotis marmorobrunnea  Razowski & Wojtusiak, 2006
Orthocomotis mediana Razowski, Pelz & Wojtusiak, 2007
Orthocomotis melania  Clarke, 1956
Orthocomotis melanochlora  (Meyrick, 1931) 
Orthocomotis miranda Razowski & Wojtusiak, 2011
Orthocomotis muscosana  (Zeller, 1866) 
Orthocomotis nitida  Clarke, 1956
Orthocomotis ochracea  Clarke, 1956
Orthocomotis ochrosaphes  Clarke, 1956
Orthocomotis olivata  Dognin, 1905
Orthocomotis oxapampae Razowski & Wojtusiak, 2010
Orthocomotis pactoana Razowski, Pelz & Wojtusiak, 2007
Orthocomotis parandina Razowski & Wojtusiak, 2010
Orthocomotis parattonsa  Razowski & Pelz, 2003
Orthocomotis parexpansa Razowski, Pelz & Wojtusiak, 2007
Orthocomotis phenax  (Razowski & Becker, 1990) 
Orthocomotis prochaldera  Clarke, 1956
Orthocomotis pseudolivata  Clarke, 1956
Orthocomotis puyoana Razowski, Pelz & Wojtusiak, 2007
Orthocomotis sachatamiae Razowski, Pelz & Wojtusiak, 2007
Orthocomotis shuara Razowski, Pelz & Wojtusiak, 2007
Orthocomotis similis  Brown, 2003
Orthocomotis smaragditis  (Meyrick, 1912) 
Orthocomotis sucumbiana Razowski, Pelz & Wojtusiak, 2007
Orthocomotis tambitoa Razowski & Wojtusiak, 2011
Orthocomotis trissophricta  (Meyrick, 1932) 
Orthocomotis twila  Clarke, 1956
Orthocomotis volochilesia Razowski, Pelz & Wojtusiak, 2007
Orthocomotis yanayacu Razowski, Pelz & Wojtusiak, 2007

References

 , 1905, Ann. Soc. Ent. Belg. 49: 85.
 , 2005, World Catalogue of Insects 5
 , 2006: Tortricidae from Venezuela (Lepidoptera: Tortricidae). Shilap Revista de Lepidopterologia 34 133): 35-79 
 , 2010: Tortricidae (Lepidoptera) from Peru. Acta Zoologica Cracoviensia 53B (1-2): 73-159. . Full article: .
 , 2010: Some Tortricidae from the East Cordillera in Ecuador reared from larvae in Yanayacu Biological Station in Ecuador (Insecta: Lepidoptera). Genus 21 (4): 585-603. Full article: .
 , 2011: Tortricidae (Lepidoptera) from Colombia). Acta Zoologica Cracoviensia 54B (1-2): 103-128. Full article: .
 , 2013: Accessions to the fauna of Neotropical Tortricidae (Lepidoptera). Acta Zoologica Cracoviensia, 56 (1): 9-40. Full article: .

External links
tortricidae.com
Reassessment of the systematic position of Orthocomotis DOGNIN (Lepidoptera: Tortricidae) based on molecular data with description of new species of Euliini

 
Euliini
Tortricidae genera